Angelina Alexandrovna Gabueva (born 7 December 1988) is a Russian tennis player. Gabueva has won two singles and 17 doubles titles on the ITF Circuit. On 17 June 2013, she reached her best singles ranking of world No. 423. On 26 September 2022, she peaked at No. 94 in the doubles rankings.

Career
Gabueva made her WTA Tour debut at the 2006 Tashkent Open, partnering Diana Narzykulova in doubles, they lost their first-round match against fellow Russians Anastasia Rodionova and Galina Voskoboeva.

In October 2021, Gabueva and Anastasia Zakharova reached their first WTA tournament final at the Astana Open which they lost to Anna-Lena Friedsam and Monica Niculescu.

Her first WTA Tour-level main-draw match in singles was at the 2022 Internationaux de Strasbourg, where she advanced as a lucky loser.

WTA career finals

Doubles: 2 (2 runner-ups)

WTA Challenger finals

Doubles: 1 (runner-up)

ITF Circuit finals

Singles: 4 (2 titles, 2 runner-ups)

Doubles: 34 (17 titles, 17 runner-ups)

References

External links

 
 

1988 births
Living people
Sportspeople from Vladikavkaz
Russian female tennis players